The Huntsman: Winter's War is a 2016 American fantasy action-adventure film and both a prequel and sequel to Snow White and the Huntsman (2012). The directorial debut of Cedric Nicolas-Troyan (who was a visual effects supervisor and second unit director on the first film), it takes place before and after the events of the first film. The screenplay was written by Craig Mazin and Evan Spiliotopoulos and is based on characters created by Evan Daugherty. (These, like the first film, were inspired by the fairy tale "Snow White" compiled by the Brothers Grimm, as well as "The Snow Queen" by Hans Christian Andersen.). Chris Hemsworth, Charlize Theron, Nick Frost and Sam Claflin reprised their roles from the first film; the sequel also introduced new characters played by Emily Blunt, Jessica Chastain and Rob Brydon.

The Huntsman: Winter's War premiered in Hamburg on March 29, 2016 and was released in the United States on April 22, 2016, by Universal Pictures. The film has received generally unfavourable reviews from critics, with praise for the visuals and cast but many feeling the film was unnecessary. It grossed $165 million worldwide against an estimated $115 million production budget.

Plot
Evil sorceress Queen Ravenna's powers allow her to know that her younger sister Princess Freya, whose powers have not yet emerged, is not only involved in an illicit affair with nobleman Andrew, but is also pregnant with his child. Freya gives birth to a baby girl, but discovers that Andrew has murdered their child. In grief-fueled rage, her broken heart freezes over and she kills him with her sudden emergence of powers - the elemental control of ice.

Freya runs away, building herself a new kingdom in the icy mountains in the north. Ruling as the much-feared Ice Queen, she orders parents to be killed and their children to be brought to her castle so they can be trained as an army to conquer for her. She teaches them to avoid the pain of love that she suffered but despite it, two of her best huntsmen, Eric and Sara, fall in love. Sara claims Eric in "marriage" by giving him her mother's medallion necklace. They plan to escape to a free life together, but are discovered by Freya. Sara is apparently killed while Eric is beaten and thrown into a river.

Seven years later, after Ravenna's death (in the first film), Queen Snow White falls ill after hearing Ravenna's Magic Mirror beckon her. Because of its dark magic, she orders it to be taken to Sanctuary, the magical place that sheltered her during the events leading to Ravenna's defeat. Snow White's husband, William, informs Eric that the soldiers tasked with carrying the Mirror went missing en route. Knowing its dark magic can make Freya stronger, Eric agrees to try and retrieve the Mirror; Snow White's dwarf ally Nion and his half-brother Gryff accompany him.

They travel to the last location of the soldiers. Eric discovers they killed one another with their own weapons. The trio are attacked by Freya's huntsmen and are rescued by Sara, revealed to be alive. Sara explains that she was imprisoned by Freya and only escaped recently. She has not forgiven Eric, thinking that he abandoned her. They decipher that Eric was shown an illusion of Sara's death while she was made to see him running rather than fighting. Eric convinces her that Freya tricked them.

The group go to the forest of the goblins who stole the mirror. During the fight, Sara notices that Eric still wears the necklace she gave him. They retrieve the mirror and save each other in another fight. That night, Eric and Sara have sex. The next morning, Freya attacks and reveals that Sara has been loyal to her all along. Sara shoots an arrow at Eric and Freya departs with the Mirror, unaware that Sara purposely hit Eric's medallion necklace, protecting him from dying. At her palace, Freya asks the Mirror who is the "fairest of them all," resurrecting Ravenna, who became one with the Mirror when Snow White vanquished her.

Eric attempts to assassinate Freya, but is stopped by Ravenna. Ravenna begins to attack the huntsmen and Freya, who has come to regard the huntsmen as her own children, protects them with an ice wall. As Eric, Sara and the huntsmen climb over the wall to retrieve the Mirror and help Freya, the sisters argue. Ravenna lets slip that she's responsible for Freya's powers. Suspicious, Freya forces Ravenna to reveal that the Mirror had told her Freya's child would become more beautiful than Ravenna. Ravenna then enchanted Andrew to kill the baby. Outraged, Freya turns on her sister, but is impaled by her. With her remaining strength, she freezes the Mirror and Eric shatters it, destroying Ravenna. As Freya dies, she smiles at a vision of her younger self holding her baby.

With Freya's death, those who had been imprisoned by her magic are set free. Eric and Sara are free to have a life together for the first time.

In a post-credits scene, Snow White, having recovered from her illness, is seen from behind, as a mysterious golden bird lands on the balcony next to her.

Cast
 Chris Hemsworth as Eric: An exceptional warrior and Freya's former Huntsman.
 Conrad Khan as Young Eric
 Charlize Theron as Queen Ravenna: Snow White's evil stepmother.
 Emily Blunt as Queen Freya: Ravenna's sister.
 Jessica Chastain as Sara: Eric's wife who was thought to be dead by and through Freya's deceiving powers.
 Niamh Walter as Young Sara
 Nick Frost as Nion: a Dwarf who previously helped Eric and Snow White defeat Ravenna's army.
 Sam Claflin as King William: the King of Tabor and Snow White's husband who helped her and Eric defeat Ravenna's army.
 Rob Brydon as Gryff: A debt-collecting Dwarf who is Nion's half-brother.
 Sheridan Smith as Bromwyn: A feisty and greedy Dwarf who becomes allies with Nion and Gryff.
 Alexandra Roach as Doreena: A female Dwarf and Nion's love interest.
 Sope Dirisu as Tull: A fellow warrior raised by Freya.
 Sophie Cookson as Pippa: A fellow warrior raised by Freya.
 Amelia Crouch as Young Pippa
 Sam Hazeldine as Liefr: A fellow warrior raised by Freya.
 Colin Morgan as Andrew: Freya's lover.
 Robert Portal as the unnamed King and husband of Ravenna and the ruler of an unnamed Kingdom.
 Fred Tatasciore as Mirror Man : The physical form of the Magic Mirror.
 Madeleine Worrall as Eric's Mother
 Liam Neeson as Narrator
 Kristen Stewart as Snow White (uncredited; archive footage)

Production

Development
A sequel to Snow White and the Huntsman was initially planned with director Rupert Sanders in talks to return. The sequel plans were changed in August 2012 to a spin-off film concentrating on the Huntsman instead. Universal announced a few days later that they were not shelving the sequel. Another report stated that Universal authorised a sequel with Stewart set to reprise her role, but without Sanders to return as the director. A script was written and production was set to begin at some point in 2013, with the film to be released in 2015. On June 4, 2014, Deadline reported that Frank Darabont, Gavin O'Connor and Andrés Muschietti were on the shortlist to direct a sequel. On June 26, 2014, Deadline confirmed that Darabont was in talks to direct the sequel.

On July 31, 2014, it was announced that the film would be a prequel titled Huntsman and would not star Stewart as Snow White. Two years later, Stewart said that she voluntarily turned down an offer from the studio to provide a cameo in the film. On January 16, 2015, it was announced that Darabont had exited the film after he parted with Universal. Hemsworth and Theron were set to return for the film, while Emily Blunt was being circled for a new role. On January 20, 2015, it was confirmed that VFX specialist Cedric Nicolas-Troyan was set to direct the film, whose last draft was written by Darabont, following drafts by Craig Mazin and Evan Spiliotopoulos.

Casting

On February 24, 2015, Jessica Chastain was set to star in the film, Nick Frost was confirmed to reprise his previous role, while Blunt, who had been rumored to be interested, finally closed a deal to star as well. On March 18, 2015, it was revealed that Sheridan Smith, Rob Brydon and Alexandra Roach were added to the cast to play dwarves alongside Frost's character Nion. TheWrap confirmed on May 7, 2015, that Sam Claflin would return as William in the sequel.

Filming
Principal photography on the film began on April 6, 2015. Filming took place at Waverley Abbey in Surrey, England in April 2015. Filming also occurred from May to July 2015 in Windsor Great Park, England, at locations including South Forest, Johnson's Pond and in the Deer Park near Snow Hill. Filming was also done in Wells Bishop's Palace and Wells Cathedral. In July 2015, filming also took place at Puzzlewood, in the Forest of Dean.

Music
On October 8, 2015, it was officially announced, that James Newton Howard would return to score the film, after creating the music for Snow White and the Huntsman. The score album was released on April 22, 2016. Singer Halsey promoted the film by releasing an alternate version of her song "Castle", along with a subsequent music video, made for the film.

Release
On July 31, 2014, Universal Pictures announced the film's release date would be April 22, 2016. In February 2016, it was announced that the film would be released in 3D in international markets like Germany. In Poland, the theatrical release was scheduled for April 8, 2016, which was the date for many other international markets.

Marketing
On November 16, 2015, Universal Pictures unveiled four character posters for the film, along with the film's new title, The Huntsman: Winter's War. Three days later, on November 18, 2015, the first official trailer of the film was released, along with two additional teaser posters. A second trailer debuted on February 11, 2016. Universal released a final trailer on March 22, 2016. Hemsworth, Theron and Chastain introduced a performance by Halsey of "Castle" at the 2016 MTV Movie Awards.

Home media
The Huntsman: Winter's War was released on Digital HD on August 2, 2016 and was followed by a release on Blu-ray and DVD on August 23, 2016. The film debuted at No. 1 on the home video sales chart. A Blu-ray extended edition (with DVD & digital HD) was also released with a run time of 120 minutes.

Reception

Box office
The Huntsman: Winter's War grossed $48.4 million in North America and $116.6 million in other territories for a worldwide total of $165 million, against a production budget of $115 million.

North America
In the United States and Canada, early tracking suggested the film would open to $24–30 million, which was significantly lower than its predecessor's $56.2 million opening in 2012. The film opened in 3,791 theaters and grossed $7.3 million on its first day, including $1 million from its early Thursday night previews. In its opening weekend, it grossed a lower-than-expected $19.4 million, which was about 64% less than the original film's opening. Due to its underperforming opening weekend, the film lost Universal $30–40 million, with some estimates having the total losses at up to $70 million. The Hollywood Reporter estimated the film lost the studio at least $75 million, when factoring together all expenses and revenues.

Outside North America
Internationally, The Huntsman: Winter's War was released in a total of 65 countries. There were some estimates that the film will end its run at about $150 million internationally, which is lower than its predecessor's total of $240 million. One notable difference is that while Winter's War has secured a release date in China, Snow White and the Huntsman did not play there and analysts believe that could make "some difference". It was released in 18 countries two weeks ahead of its U.S. debut, earning $19.1 million from 3,969 screens and had No. 1 openings in eleven of them and second overall at the international box office charts, behind the superhero film Batman v Superman: Dawn of Justice. In its second weekend, it added 7 new markets and grossed a total of $17.8 million, falling only by 8% from its previews weekend and still remained at No. 2, behind The Jungle Book.  It was still No. 2 in its third weekend. Its top openings occurred in China ($10.4 million), the United Kingdom and Ireland ($4.2 million), Brazil ($3.1 million), Mexico ($2.8 million), France ($2.6 million), Korea ($2.1 million), Russia ($2 million), the Philippines ($1.6 million), Malaysia ($1.6 million), Spain ($1.4 million) and Thailand ($1.2 million). In China, it was in third place, behind local pic Yesterday Once More and the continued run of The Jungle Book. It lost a tremendous number of screens in its second weekend due to the arrival of three new local pics – Book of Love, Phantom of the Theater and MBA Partners – along with the continued run of The Jungle Book and as a result it grossed just $710,000.

In terms of total earnings, its largest markets outside of North America are China ($15.6 million), the UK ($7.3 million) and Mexico ($7.2 million).

Critical response
On Rotten Tomatoes the film has a rating of 20%, based on 220 reviews, with an average rating of 4.30/10. The site's consensus reads, "The Huntsman: Winter's War is visually arresting and boasts a stellar cast, but neither are enough to recommend this entirely unnecessary sequel." On Metacritic, the film has a score of 35 out of 100, based on 41 critics, indicating "generally unfavourable reviews". Audiences polled by CinemaScore gave the film an average grade of "B+" on an A+ to F scale and PostTrak surveys give it a total positive score of 72%, but only a 49% audience recommendation.

Accolades

References

External links

 
 

2010s American films
2010s English-language films
2010s fantasy adventure films
2016 3D films
2016 directorial debut films
2016 films
American action adventure films
American dark fantasy films
American fantasy adventure films
American films about revenge
Film spin-offs
Films about child soldiers
Films about royalty
Films about witchcraft
Films based on Snow White
Films based on The Snow Queen
Films based on multiple works
Films directed by Cedric Nicolas-Troyan
Films produced by Joe Roth
Films scored by James Newton Howard
Films set in castles
Films set in the Middle Ages
Films shot at Pinewood Studios
Films using motion capture
Films with screenplays by Evan Spiliotopoulos
High fantasy films
Perfect World Pictures films
Sororicide in fiction
Universal Pictures films
Films with screenplays by Craig Mazin